Marlene Ahrens Ostertag-Ebensperger (July 27, 1933 – June 17, 2020) was a Chilean athlete. She won the silver medal in Javelin throw at the 1956 Summer Olympics in Melbourne with a distance of 50.38 metres. She was the mother of journalist Karin Ebensperger.

Biography 
Ostertag was born in Concepción, Chile, the daughter of German immigrants. In Melbourne, she was the Chilean flag bearer, and the only woman on the Olympic team. She participated in the Javelin throw, winning the silver medal with a distance of 50.38 metres. In doing so, she became the first and only Chilean woman who has won an Olympic medal. After the games, she won gold in both 1959 Pan American Games, held in Chicago, and 1963 Pan American Games held in São Paulo. Also, she again was the flag bearer in the 1960 Summer Olympics in Rome, although she didn't win a medal. Ahrens was forced to retire after having a dispute with the Chilean newspaper Clarín, and she was banned from competing in the 1964 Summer Olympics in Tokyo.

After athletics she began to play tennis and in 1967, won the Chilean national tournament in mixed doubles with Omar Pabst. Soon after that, she injured her knee and dedicated her life to Equestrianism. She competed in the 1995 Pan American Games in Mar del Plata. She retired from horse riding in 2012, at 79 years old.

She married Jorge Roberto Ebensperger Grassau, a hockey player and another descendant of German settlers; they gave birth to 2 children: Karin Ebensperger and Roberto Ebensperger. She is the grandmother of Marlén Eguiguren, also a journalist like her mother Karin.

On the night of June 17, 2020, Ahrens died of heart failure at the age of 86.

References

1933 births
2020 deaths
Chilean people of German descent
Chilean female javelin throwers
Olympic athletes of Chile
Athletes (track and field) at the 1956 Summer Olympics
Athletes (track and field) at the 1960 Summer Olympics
Athletes (track and field) at the 1959 Pan American Games
Athletes (track and field) at the 1963 Pan American Games
Olympic silver medalists for Chile
Sportspeople from Concepción, Chile
Medalists at the 1956 Summer Olympics
Pan American Games gold medalists for Chile
Pan American Games medalists in athletics (track and field)
Olympic silver medalists in athletics (track and field)
Equestrians at the 1995 Pan American Games
Chilean female equestrians
Medalists at the 1959 Pan American Games
Medalists at the 1963 Pan American Games
20th-century Chilean women